Aroa is a genus of moths in the subfamily Lymantriinae first described by Francis Walker in 1855. Species are distributed in South Africa, China, throughout India, Sri Lanka, Myanmar, and Java.

Description
They are diurnal fliers. The genus differs from Orgyia due to much longer palpi and less-hairy body. Third joint prominent. Legs are less hairy. Female has fully developed wings. Antennae branches are shorter than in male.

Species
Some species of this genus are:
Aroa abalia Collenette, 1949 western Java
Aroa achrodisca Hampson, 1910 Senegal
Aroa anthora (Felder, 1874)
Aroa asthenes Collenette, 1938 Palawan
Aroa atrella Hampson, [1893] Sikkim, Assam
Aroa atrescens Hampson, 1897 Khasia Hills
Aroa callista (Collenette, 1933) Kivu
Aroa campbelli Hampson, 1905 India (Chennai)
Aroa clara Swinhoe, 1885 Bombay
Aroa cometaris Butler, 1887 Solomons
Aroa danva Schaus & Clements, 1893 Sierra Leone
Aroa difficilis Walker, 1855 southern Africa
Aroa discalis Walker, 1855 southern Africa
Aroa eugonia Collenette, 1953 Ivory Coast
Aroa gyroptera Collenette, 1938 Philippines (Luzon)
Aroa incerta Rogenhofer, 1891 Kenya
Aroa interrogationis Collenette, 1938 Uganda
Aroa kambaiti Collenette, 1960 Myanmar
Aroa leonensis Hampson, 1910 Sierra Leone
Aroa luteifascia (Hampson, 1895) Myanmar
Aroa major Hampson, [1893] Sri Lanka
Aroa maxima Hampson, [1893] Sri Lanka
Aroa melanoleuca Hampson, 1905 Angola
Aroa melaxantha (Walker, 1865) southern Africa
Aroa nepalensis Daniel, 1961 Nepal
Aroa nigripicta Holland, 1893 western Africa
Aroa ochripicta Moore, 1879 Hong Kong
Aroa ochrota (Hampson, 1904) Kerala
Aroa pampoecila Collenette, 1930 Tanganyika
Aroa plana (Walker, 1855) northern India
Aroa postfusca Gaede, 1932 Yunnan
Aroa pyrrhochroma Walker, 1865 Sikkim, Bhutan, India
Aroa quadrimaculata (Janse, 1915) Zimbabwe
Aroa quadriplagata Pagenstecher, 1903 north-eastern Africa
Aroa risoria Swinhoe, 1903 Java
Aroa sagrara Swinhoe, 1885
Aroa scytodes Collenette, 1932 Malaysia
Aroa sienna Hampson, 1891 Nilgiris
Aroa simplex (Walker, 1865) southern India
Aroa socrus (Geyer, 1837) Java
Aroa subnotata (Walker, 1855) Sri Lanka
Aroa tomisa Druce, 1896 eastern Africa
Aroa vosseleri (Grünberg, 1907) Tanzania
Aroa xerampelina (Swinhoe, 1885) Pune
Aroa yokoae Bethune-Baker, 1927 Cameroon

References

Lymantriinae
Moth genera